The Pointe at North Fayette is a retail development about 15 minutes west of downtown Pittsburgh, Pennsylvania in North Fayette Township. It is located on Summit Park Dr. Pittsburgh, PA 15275. The Pointe is unique in that it has an exit off one of Pittsburgh's busiest highways, I-376/US 22/US 30 (known locally as the Parkway West). The Pointe is located about seven miles from the entrance of the Pittsburgh International Airport and is also right next to the Park Lane and RIDC Park West Office Parks.

A bridge over I-376 connects The Pointe to The Mall at Robinson and Robinson Town Centre.

Retailers
America's Best Contacts & Eyeglasses
Armina Stone
AT&T
Batteries + Bulbs Plus
Bed Bath & Beyond
Best Buy
Bob's Discount Furniture
Don's Appliance Outlet Center
Ethos Cannabis Dispenary
FedEx Office Print & Ship Services
Ferguson Bath, Kitchen & Lighting Gallery
GameStop
Hallmark Cards
Hand & Stone Massage
The Home Depot
Jared: The Galleria of Jewelry
La-Z-Boy
Levin Furniture
Lowe's
Mattress Firm
Men's Wearhouse
Molyneaux Tile Carpet & Wood
Old Navy
The Original Mattress Factory
Party City - Closed Fall 2020
PetSmart
Pool City
Sam's Club
Sanaljon
Seven Seas Pools and Spas
Sherwin-Williams
Speedy Furniture - Closed Winter 2021
Sprint
Target
T-Mobile
Walmart Supercenter
xfinity Store

Restaurants
 Bravo
 Buffalo Wild Wings
 Burgatory
 Burger King
 Chick-fil-A
 Chipotle Mexican Grill
 Choolaah
 Cracker Barrel
 El Campesino
 Firehouse Subs
 Five Guys Burgers and Fries
 Industry Public House
 Jimmy John's
 Lowkey Taco
 Max & Erma's - Closed Summer 2020
 McDonald's
 Naturoll Creamery - Closed 2020
 Panera Bread
 Papaya Thai Cuisine - Closed Summer 2020
 Quaker Steak & Lube
 Starbucks (2 locations - one standalone, one inside Target)
 Uncle Sam's Sandwich Bar
 The Yard
 Coming Soon: Piada Italian Street Food, Sushi Atarashi, Nothing Bundt Cakes

Tire service
Firestone Tire Center
Monro Muffler Brake
NTB

Entertainment
Burn Boot Camp
Orangetheory Fitness
Pure Barre
Urban Air Adventure Park

Hotels
 Sonesta Simply Suites
 Extended Stay Hotels
 Microtel Inn and Suites
 Staybridge Suites

Agencies and banks
 Bank of America
 Citizens Bank
 Liberty Travel

Dental, hair, medical, and nails
 Alora Salon and Spa
 Ann's Spa and Nails
 Berg Dental
 Great Clips
 Highmark Direct

History
A few years after I-376 opened (in the late 1950s) the area was occupied by "Hagan Co."

The development first opened in 1997 with the completion of a Walmart and Sam's Club.  In 2000, a Target store was added and the Walmart store became a SuperCenter.

Between construction of Walmart and Target, smaller strip plazas in The Pointe began opening up, including some hotels.

There are also other plazas within The Pointe at North Fayette including: The Lafayette Plaza and The Montour Plaza.

References

External links
 Pgh Business Times: Pointe at North Fayette overcomes topography issues to enjoy growth
 Pgh Post-Gazette: The retail boom may slow a bit but should continue

Shopping malls in Metro Pittsburgh
Shopping malls established in 1997
1997 establishments in Pennsylvania